The Stockdale Group is a Silurian lithostratigraphic group (a sequence of rock strata) in the southern Lake District and Howgill Fells of the Pennines of northern England. The name is derived from the locality of Stockdale near the top of Longsleddale in Cumbria. It is included within the Windermere Supergroup. The rocks of the Group have also previously been referred to as the Stockdale Shales or Stockdale Subgroup. The group comprises limestones and oolites and some sandstones and shales which reach a maximum thickness of 120m in the area. It is divided into a lower Skelgill Formation which is overlain by an upper Browgill Formation.

References

 

Silurian System of Europe
Geology of England
Geological groups of the United Kingdom
Geologic formations of the United Kingdom